Saqr a line of Unmanned aerial vehicles produced by the King Abdulaziz City for Science and Technology for the government of Saudi Arabia.  , three models had been developed: Saqr 2, Saqr 3 and Saqr 4. All three models are manufactured from fiberglass and carbon composite material, making them lightweight and stealthy. The Saudi government has developed the craft for research purposes, and the units are equipped with cameras for aerial photography. According to Prince Turki bin Saud bin Mohammed, the Saqr-1 has a range of more than 2,500 km and can remain airborne for more than 24 hours. The UAV flies at an average altitude of 20,000 feet.

It features a Ka band satellite communications system. These weapons are Chinese AR-1 laser-guided missile and FT-9 guided bomb.

The units were first developed in 2012 with a total of 38 built .

Variants
Saqr 1 
Saqr 2
Saqr 3
Saqr 4

References

Sources 
 

Unmanned aerial vehicles of Saudi Arabia